Vataireopsis is a genus of flowering plants in the legume family, Fabaceae. It belongs to the subfamily Faboideae. It was traditionally assigned to the tribe Dalbergieae, mainly on the basis of flower morphology; recent molecular phylogenetic analyses assigned Vataireopsis into an informal, monophyletic clade called the "vataireoids".

References

Faboideae
Fabaceae genera
Taxa named by Adolpho Ducke